Police vehicles in Taiwan are used by the National Police Agency to enforce the law, maintain public and social order, and deal with crime in the country. Many different types of vehicles are used depending on the duties of the police force.

See also
 Ministry of the Interior (Taiwan)
 Executive Yuan
 Republic of China Military Police
 Coast Guard Administration (Taiwan)
 Ministry of Justice Investigation Bureau
 Law Enforcement

External links

 National Police Agency, MOI
 National Police Administration from GlobalSecurity.org

Law enforcement in Taiwan
Taiwan